Chi Capricorni, Latinized from χ Capricorni, is a star in the southern constellation of Capricornus. Based upon an annual parallax shift of 18.14 mas as seen from the Earth, the star is located about 180 light years from the Sun. It is visible to the naked eye with an apparent visual magnitude of +5.28.

Properties
This is an A-type main sequence star with a stellar classification of A0 V. It is a candidate Lambda Boötis star, showing a chemically peculiar spectrum with a low abundance of most elements heavier than oxygen. The star is around 251 million years old and is spinning rapidly with a projected rotational velocity of 212 km/s. It has 2.78 times the mass of the Sun and is radiating 21 times the solar luminosity from its photosphere at an effective temperature of 10,878 K.

At an angular separation of 1,199 arcseconds lies a faint proper motion companion designated HIP 99550. At the estimated distance of Chi Capricorni, this is equal to a projected separation of 28,300 AU. It has a visual magnitude of 10.94 and a classification of M0 Vk, indicating this is a red dwarf star.

Chinese Name
Consequently, the Chinese name for χ Capricorni itself represents the state Qi, together with 112 Herculis in Left Wall of Heavenly Market Enclosure (asterism).

R.H.Allen had opinion that χ Capricorni, together with φ Capricorni, were represent the state Wei (魏).

References

A-type main-sequence stars
Capricorni, Chi
Capricornus (constellation)
Durchmusterung objects
Capricorni, 25
201184
104365
8087